Nicolas Ardouin (born 7 February 1978) is a French former professional footballer who played as a goalkeeper.

Career
Ardouin was born in La Rochelle, Charente-Maritime. His first years in professional football were spent in the lower leagues, first with Grenoble Foot 38 then La Roche VF. In 2002, he moved to level two with ASOA Valence, but only amassed 18 matches in two seasons combined.

In 2004–05, Ardouin moved abroad with Deportivo Alavés, again only being backup. In his second season, as the Basque had returned to La Liga, he was as low as third-string, behind Argentine Franco Costanzo and Roberto Bonano, and did not appear at all.

Ardouin moved countries again in 2008, joining  A.F.C. Tubize in Belgium. He had his most solid campaign as a professional, but the club was finally relegated.

External links
 
 
 

1978 births
Living people
French footballers
Association football goalkeepers
Ligue 2 players
Grenoble Foot 38 players
La Roche VF players
ASOA Valence players
Deportivo Alavés players
Belgian Pro League players
A.F.C. Tubize players
French expatriate footballers
French expatriate sportspeople in Spain